Campolindo High School is a public high school located in Moraga, California, United States, and is in the Acalanes Union High School District.

In 2019, Campolindo was ranked 30th in California (and 239th nationally) by U.S. News & World Report.

Athletics 

The Campolindo Cougars have programs in men's football, women's volleyball, men's/women's basketball, men's baseball, men's/women's water polo, men's/women's cross country, men's/women's track and field, men's/women's tennis men's/women's swimming and diving, men's/women's soccer and men's volleyball.

The women's cross-country team has won seven CIF state championships (2001, 2010, 2013, 2017, 2019, 2021, 2022).
The football team has won two CIF state championships (2014, 2016).
The men's basketball team has won two CIF state championships (2019, 2020 (co-champions)). The men's cross-country team has won one CIF state championship in 2019.

Notable alumni 
  Herbie Herbert, music manager and musician.
 Stephen Robinson, astronaut
 Peter Rocca, Olympic swimmer
 Chip Hale, professional baseball player and coach 
 Matt Biondi, Olympic swimmer
 Paul Faries, professional baseball player
 Matt Vasgersian, sportscaster and television host
 Jon Zuber, professional baseball player
Stephen Bishop, Actor
 Carey Schueler, first woman ever drafted by a Major League Baseball team
 Bryce Pinkham, actor
 Nina LaCour, author
 Jennifer Ketcham (Penny Flame), reality TV star, author, blogger, and adult film actress and director
 Jeff Stevens, professional baseball player
 Kim Vandenberg, Olympic swimmer 
 Peter Varellas, Olympic water polo player
 Cameron Ochs, musician
 Aaron Poreda, professional baseball player 
 Conrad Bassett-Bouchard, professional Scrabble player 
 Giorgio Tavecchio, professional American football player
 Erika Henningsen, actress
 Sven Gamsky (Still Woozy), musician
 James Marvel, Minor League baseball player
 John Torchio, college football player
 Aidan Mahaney, college basketball player

Notable staff
 Wayne Franklin, a former professional baseball player, coached the baseball team from 2015 to 2016.

References

External links 

 

High schools in Contra Costa County, California
Public high schools in California
1962 establishments in California
Educational institutions established in 1962